Play is a 23-minute instrumental composition composed and performed by Dave Grohl and released in 2018.

Recording and composition

Dave Grohl stated that he was inspired by his daughters' music lessons to undertake one of the most challenging projects of his career. As the front man of rock band Foo Fighters, Grohl found some time during their world tour for their Concrete and Gold album to write and record the 23-minute instrumental. Grohl stated that he was inspired by watching children at music classes, including his daughters, rehearsing songs over and over again to play them perfectly. Grohl also created a two part documentary that includes him performing seven different versions of "Play" and interviewing young students at the Join the Band music school near his home in Los Angeles. Grohl plays all of the instruments on the 23-minute "Play". However, when he debuted the song live he recruited members from another of his side projects, Them Crooked Vultures and also the band Jane's Addiction. They debuted it live on December 8, 2018 at The Warren Haynes Christmas Jam in Asheville.

Personnel
 Dave Grohl – electric and acoustic guitars, bass guitars, drums, Wurlitzer electric piano, synthesizers, Mellotron, vibraphone, timpani, percussion
 Darrell Thorp – engineering, mixing
 Tyler Shields – assistant engineer
 David Ives – mastering

Charts

Weekly charts
Singles charts

Album charts

Year-end charts

Accolades

References

Dave Grohl EPs
Instrumental rock EPs
RCA Records EPs
Roswell Records EPs
Albums produced by Dave Grohl
2018 EPs